John D. Roth is the current editor of The Mennonite Quarterly Review and director of the Institute for the Study of Global Anabaptism at Goshen College. He received his PhD from the University of Chicago. His books include Choosing Against War: A Christian View, Beliefs: Mennonite Faith and Practice, Stories: How Mennonites Came to Be, and Practices: Mennonite Worship and Witness. He discussed his book on war in several places including the Netherlands. He has also written for Christianity Today concerning the Anabaptists and Amish.

Roth edited Constantine Revisited: Leithart, Yoder, and the Constantinian Debate, a collection of essays by Christian pacifists defending John Howard Yoder's argument that Constantine steered the Church in the wrong direction by abandoning Christ's doctrine of nonviolence, exemplified by his willingness to die rather than defend himself, from Peter Leithart's criticism that God did not want Christians to live as a powerless, oppressed minority.

He currently teaches at Goshen College.

References 

Mennonite writers
University of Chicago alumni
Goshen College faculty
Academic journal editors
Living people
Year of birth missing (living people)